The Mitsui Falcons were a Japanese basketball team that played in the Japan Basketball League. They were based in Kashiwa, Chiba.

Notable players
LeRon Ellis
Marcus Kennedy
Cornell Parker
Steve Thompson (basketball, born 1968)
Demone Webster
Jeff Webster

Coaches
Tomoya Higashino (asst)

References

Defunct basketball teams in Japan
Sports teams in Chiba Prefecture
Basketball teams established in 1946
Basketball teams disestablished in 1999
1946 establishments in Japan
1999 disestablishments in Japan
Kashiwa